Lafayette station may refer to:

Lafayette station (Indiana), an Amtrak station in Lafayette, Indiana
Lafayette station (Louisiana), an Amtrak station in Lafayette, Louisiana
Lafayette station (BART), a train station in Lafayette, California

See also
Lafayette Square (Metro Rail), a Buffalo Metro Rail station
Lafayette Avenue (BMT Fulton Street Line), a former New York City Subway station
Lafayette Avenue (IND Fulton Street Line), a New York City Subway station